Odoardo Ceccarelli ( 1600 – 7 March 1668) was an Italian singer, composer, and writer prominent in the Sistine Chapel Choir and the Barberini court. Described from the beginning of his career as both a tenor and a bass, he created roles in several operas, including Fileno in Michelangelo Rossi's Erminia sul Giordano and  Orlando in Luigi Rossi's Il palazzo incantato.

Life and career
Ceccarelli was born in Bevagna. His father Pannonio was a meat carver. His grandfather Alfonso was a notorious doctor and genealogist who was executed in 1581 for falsifying documents. The first record of his activity in Rome is from 1620 when he was listed as a choir member at the church of Santo Spirito in Sassia. In 1622 he entered the Collegium Germanicum. He remained resident there for a year, but continued to sing in the choir of Sant'Apollinare, the Collegium's church, on multiple occasions up to 1645. During his time with the choir he trained with Giacomo Carissimi who trained several other prominent Roman singers, including Giuseppe Bianchi and the castrato Giovannino. Ceccarelli was also considered an outstanding interpreter of Carissimi's motets which they often performed together.

Ceccarelli was appointed to the Sistine Chapel Choir in January 1628. He later served as the choir's chamberlain (camerlengo) in 1630 and its secretary (puntatore) in 1647. He was appointed  maestro di cappella in 1652. In addition to his activities with the Papal choir, Ceccarelli sang in the festivities in Parma celebrating the marriage of Margherita de' Medici and Odoardo Farnese in 1628 as well as at the court of Ferdinando II in 1635 and at the church of San Luigi dei Francesi on several occasions between 1631 and 1653. He also sang in five operas performed in Rome between 1633 and 1645. 

From the earliest years of his career Ceccarelli was described in some records as a tenor and in others a bass. The musicologist Alberto Iesuè has speculated that his true voice type was probably a bass and that he sang tenor parts in falsetto. However, in Tenor: History of a Voice, John Potter refers to a type of voice with an extended register which he calls "tenor-bass" and notes that several other virtuoso singers of the 17th century who were described as tenors by their contemporaries could also sing in the bass register. A similar view on the existence of this voice type has been expressed by Rodolfo Celletti.

Ceccarelli retired from the Sistine Choir in 1658. He spent his later years as a prominent member of the Confraternity of the Most Holy Crucifix and served as maestro di cappella of its associated church, San Marcello, until 1667. He died on 7 March 1668. His funeral was held two days later at Santa Maria Maddalena. In his will, he left most of his money and possessions to the confraternity. According to his entry in the Großes Sängerlexikon, Ceccarelli had become a priest in 1641. In his 1710 history of the Sistine Chapel Choir, Andrea Adami refers to him as "Rev. Odoardo Ceccarelli".

Compositions and writings
Ceccarelli composed several pieces of music, including a lyric drama in Latin for four sopranos and chorus, an idyll in Italian for five voices, and a cantata for soprano and bass, Ecco il re del cielo immenso. However, the only extant score is Ecco il re del cielo immenso, which is held in the Biblioteca Casanatense. In 1634, at the request of Pope Urban VIII, he began work with Sante Naldini, Stefano Landi, and Gregorio Allegri to adapt the vocal music of older breviaries and to improve and annotate the texts of Palestrina's vocal music. The result of their work, Hymni Sacri in Breviario Romano, was published in 1644.

Described by Adami, Liberati, and Fétis as an erudite man of letters and an excellent writer of poetic texts for music in both Latin and Italian, Ceccarelli also authored two prose works on images of the Virgin Mary in Rome, both published in 1647. La miracolosa imagine della Madonna delle Gratie depinta da S. Luca describes an image of Mary in Santa Maria della Consolazione purportedly painted by Saint Luke and the miracles associated with it. Breve racconto della manifestatione della devotissima imagine della santissima Vergine describes the restoration of a fresco depicting Mary in the portico of Sant'Apollinare which survived the Sack of Rome in 1527 because the priests had it plastered over to hide it from the invaders.

Opera performances
Erminia sul Giordano (as Fileno), composed by Michelangelo Rossi to a libretto by Giulio Rospigliosi, performed at the Palazzo Barberini, Rome, 1633
Santa Teodora by an anonymous composer to a libretto by Giulio Rospigliosi, performed at the Palazzo Barberini, Rome, 1635
La sincerità trionfante composed by Angelo Cecchini to a libretto by Ottaviano Castelli, performed at the palazzo of François Annibal d'Estrées, Rome, 1638 
Il palazzo incantato (as Orlando) composed by Luigi Rossi to a libretto by Giulio Rospigliosi, performed at the Palazzo Barberini, Rome, 1642  
Il ratto di Proserpina by an anonymous composer to a libretto by Pompeo Colonna, performed at the palazzo of Pompeo Colonna principe di Gallicano, Rome, 1645

Notes

References

17th-century births
1668 deaths
Italian operatic tenors
Operatic basses
17th-century Italian male opera singers
Sistine Chapel Choir
People from Bevagna